Stoemp is a Belgian dish of pureed or mashed potatoes and other root vegetables, and can also include cream, bacon, onion or shallot, herbs, and spices.

The name of the dish sometimes includes the kind of vegetables inside it; for example, Wortelstoemp includes carrots (wortel). This specific combination may also contain egg yolk.

Pronunciation 
Stoemp is pronounced , and in some dialects .  It is a typical word of Brabantian dialects.

Ingredients and culture 
A simple, rural dish, stoemp enjoys wide appeal.

It is a dish of mashed potatoes with one or more vegetables, such as onions, carrots, leeks, spinach, green peas and cabbage, seasoned with thyme, nutmeg or bayleaf.

Stoemp is traditionally featured alongside fried boudin, fried braadworst, grilled bacon, fried mince or fried eggs.
In some families, it is served with an entrecôte or a horse tenderloin.

Similar dishes 
 Bubble and squeak, from England.
 Colcannon and champ, from Ireland.
 Rumbledethumps, from Scotland
 Pyttipanna, from Sweden
 Biksemad, from Denmark
 Trinxat, from the Empordà region of Catalonia, northeast Spain, and Andorra
 Roupa velha (Portuguese for "old clothes"), from Portugal, often made from leftovers from cozido à portuguesa
 Stamppot from The Netherlands
 Hash (food), from the United States
 Also see hash browns and potato cake entries

References

Belgian cuisine
Dutch cuisine
Dutch words and phrases
Potato dishes